The Christian Social Rally of Liberty (RSCL) was a political party in Belgium.

History
The party was formed as a neo-populist breakaway from the Christian Social Party (PSC) established by André Saint-Rémy and Jean Evrard. In the 1954 general elections the party received 0.8% of the national vote and winning a single seat in the Chamber of Representatives, which was taken by Saint-Rémy. He returned to the PSC the following year.

References

Defunct political parties in Belgium
Catholic political parties